Katharina Gutensohn (born 22 March 1966). Is an Austrian/German skier. She represented Germany from 1989 to the end of her alpine skiing career.

Biography
In 2005, at the age of 39, she made a comeback in the new Olympic discipline of ski cross. She won her first World Cup start at Grindelwald on March 5, 2005. She also finished twice on the podium, the latest a second place at St. Johann in Tirol on January 5, 2009.

She competed for Germany in alpine skiing events at the 1992, 1994 and 1998 Winter Olympics and for Austria in skicross at the 2010 Winter Olympics.

Gutensohn took part in the 8th season of the Austrian dance competition TV show Dancing Stars in 2012, finishing in 12th (last) place.

World Cup victories

References

External links
 
 

1966 births
Living people
Austrian emigrants to Germany
Austrian female alpine skiers
German female alpine skiers
Olympic alpine skiers of Germany
Alpine skiers at the 1992 Winter Olympics
Alpine skiers at the 1994 Winter Olympics
Alpine skiers at the 1998 Winter Olympics
Austrian female freestyle skiers
Olympic freestyle skiers of Austria
Freestyle skiers at the 2010 Winter Olympics
FIS Alpine Ski World Cup champions